Daniel Dalton may refer to:

 Daniel Dalton (British politician) (born 1974), English cricketer and British Member of the European Parliament
 Daniel Dalton (American politician), New Jersey politician
 Dan Dalton, music producer, Peppermint Trolley Company